San Pietro a Maida is a town and comune in the province of Catanzaro in the Calabria region of southern Italy.

Geography
The town is bordered by Curinga, Jacurso, Lamezia Terme and Maida.

Notes and references

Cities and towns in Calabria